British Steel was a major British steel producer. It originated from the nationalised British Steel Corporation (BSC), formed in 1967, which was privatised as a public limited company, British Steel plc, in 1988. It was once a constituent of the FTSE 100 Index. The company merged with Koninklijke Hoogovens to form Corus Group in 1999.

History 

Alasdair M. Blair (1997), Professor of International Relations and Head of the Department of Politics and Public Policy at De Montfort University, has explored the history of British Steel since the Second World War to evaluate the impact of government intervention in a market economy. He suggests that entrepreneurship was lacking in the 1940s; the government could not persuade the industry to upgrade its plants. For generations, the industry had followed a piecemeal growth pattern that proved relatively inefficient in the face of world competition.

The Labour Party came to power at the 1945 general election, pledging to bring several industries into state ownership. In 1946, it put the first steel development plan into practice with the aim of increasing capacity. It passed the Iron and Steel Act 1949, which meant nationalisation of the industry, as the government bought out the shareholders, and created the Iron and Steel Corporation of Great Britain. American Marshall Plan aid in 1948–50 reinforced modernisation efforts and provided funding for them. However, the nationalisation was reversed by the Conservative government after 1952.

The industry was re-nationalised in 1967 under another Labour government, becoming British Steel Corporation (BSC). But by then, 20 years of political manipulation had left companies, such as British Steel, with serious problems: a complacency with existing equipment, plants operating below full capacity (hence the low efficiency), poor-quality assets, outdated technology, government price controls, higher coal and oil costs, lack of funds for capital improvement, and increasing competition on the world market.

By the 1970s, the Labour government's main goal for the declining industry was to keep employment high. Since British Steel was a major employer in depressed regions, it was decided to keep many mills and facilities operating at a loss. In the 1980s, Conservative Prime Minister Margaret Thatcher re-privatised BSC as British Steel. Under private control, the company dramatically cut its workforce and underwent a radical reorganisation and massive capital investment to again become competitive in the world marketplace.

Nationalisation 
BSC was formed from the assets of former private companies which had been nationalised, largely under the Labour government of Harold Wilson, on 28 July 1967. Wilson's was the second attempt at nationalisation, the post-war government of Clement Attlee had created the Iron and Steel Corporation of Great Britain in 1951 taking public ownership of 80 companies but this had been largely reversed by the following Conservative governments of the 1950s with only Britain's largest steel company, Richard Thomas and Baldwins, remaining in public ownership.

BSC was established under the Iron and Steel Act 1967, which vested in the Corporation the shares of the fourteen major UK-based steel companies then in operation, being:
David Colville & Sons;
Consett Iron Company Ltd;
Dorman Long & Company Ltd;
English Steel Corporation Ltd;
GKN Steel Company Ltd;
John Summers & Sons Ltd;
The Lancashire Steel Corporation Ltd;
The Park Gate Iron and Steel Company Ltd;
Richard Thomas and Baldwins Ltd;
Round Oak Steelworks Ltd;
South Durham Steel & Iron Company Ltd;
The Steel Company of Wales Ltd;
Stewarts & Lloyds, Ltd; and
The United Steel Companies Ltd.

At the time of its formation, BSC comprised around ninety percent of the UK's steelmaking capacity; it had around 268,500 employees and around 200 wholly  or partly-owned subsidiaries based in the United Kingdom, Australia, New Zealand, Canada, Africa, South Asia, and South America.

Dorman Long, South Durham and Stewarts and Lloyds had merged as British Steel and Tube Ltd before vesting took place. BSC later arranged an exchange deal with Guest, Keen and Nettlefolds Ltd (GKN), the parent company of GKN Steel, under which BSC acquired Dowlais Ironworks at Merthyr Tydfil and GKN took over BSC's Brymbo Steelworks near Wrexham.

Restructuring 
According to Blair (1997), British Steel faced serious problems at the time of its formation, including obsolescent plants; plants operating under capacity and thus at low efficiency; outdated technology; price controls that reduced marketing flexibility; soaring coal and oil costs; lack of capital investment funds; and increasing competition on the world market. By the 1970s, the government adopted a policy of keeping employment high in the declining industry. This especially impacted BSC since it was a major employer in a number of depressed regions.

One of the arguments made in favour of nationalisation was that it would enable steel production to be rationalised. This involved concentrating investment on major integrated plants, placed near the coast for ease of access by sea, and closing older, smaller plants, especially those that had been located inland for proximity to coal supplies.

From the mid-1970s, British Steel pursued a strategy of concentrating steelmaking in five areas: South Wales, South Yorkshire, Scunthorpe, Teesside and Scotland. This policy continued following the Conservative victory at the 1979 general election. Other traditional steelmaking areas faced cutbacks. Under the Labour government of James Callaghan, a review by Lord Beswick had led to the reprieve of the so-called 'Beswick plants', for social reasons, but subsequent governments were obliged under EU rules to withdraw subsidies. Major changes resulted across Europe, including in the UK:

 At Consett, the closure of the British Steel works in 1980 marked the end of steel production in Derwent Valley and the sharp decline of the area.
 At Corby, the closure of the former Stewarts & Lloyds site in the early-1980s saw the loss of 11,000 jobs, leading to an initial unemployment rate of over 30%.
 In Wales, works at East Moors (Cardiff) closed in 1978.
Shotton closure of the heavy end with the loss of over 6,000 jobs. 
 In Scotland, Western Europe's largest hot strip steel mill Ravenscraig steelworks, near Motherwell, North Lanarkshire, was closed by British Steel in 1992, leading to high levels of unemployment in the area. It also led to the closure of several local support and satellite businesses, such as the nearby British Steel Clydesdale Works in Mossend, Clyde Alloy in Netherton and equipment maker Anderson Strathclyde. Demolition of the site's landmark blue gasometer in 1996, and the subsequent cleanup operation, has created the largest brownfield site in Europe. This huge area between Motherwell and Wishaw is in line to be transformed into the new town of Ravenscraig, a project partly funded by Corus.

Privatisation 
The Conservative manifesto for the 1987 general election noted that "British Steel has more than doubled its productivity since 1979 and made a profit last year for the first time in over ten years."

Following Margaret Thatcher's re-election, on 3 December 1987 the Conservative government formally announced in a statement by Kenneth Clarke, Minister of State for Trade and Industry, that it intended to privatise the British Steel Corporation.

On 5 September 1988 the assets, rights and liabilities of British Steel Corporation were transferred to British Steel plc, registered under the Companies Act as company number 2280000, by the British Steel Act 1988.

The government retained a special share which carried no voting rights but until 31 December 1993, permitted the government to stop any one party controlling more than 15% of the shares.

British Steel employees were given a free allocation of shares, and offered two free shares for each they purchased up to £165, discounted shares up to £2,200, and priority on applying for shares up to £10,000.

Dealing in shares opened on the London Stock Exchange on 5 December 1988.

Post-privatisation 
The privatised company later merged with the Dutch steel producer Koninklijke Hoogovens to form Corus Group on 6 October 1999. Corus itself was taken over in March 2007 by the Indian steel operator Tata Steel.

Chairmen 
Julian, Lord Melchett (1967–1973)
Monty Finniston (1973–1976)
Charles Villiers (1976–1980)
Ian MacGregor (1980–1983)
Robert Haslam (1983–1986)
Robert Scholey (1986–1992)
Sir Brian Moffat (1992-1999)

Ian MacGregor later became famous for his role as Chairman of the National Coal Board during the UK miners' strike (1984–1985). During the strike the "Battle of Orgreave" took place at British Steel's coking plant.

Sponsorships 
In 1971 British Steel sponsored Sir Chay Blyth in his record-making non-stop circumnavigation against the winds and currents, known as 'The Impossible Voyage'. In 1992 they sponsored the British Steel Challenge, the first of a series of 'wrong way' races for amateur crews.

British Steel had agreed a sponsorship deal with Middlesbrough Football Club during the 1994–95 season, with a view to British Steel-sponsored Middlesbrough shirts making their appearance the following season. But the sponsorship deal was terminated before it commenced after it was revealed that British steel only made up a tiny fraction of steel used in construction of the stadium, and that the bulk of the steel had been imported from Germany.

In popular culture 

The English rock band XTC mentioned British Steel in their 1979 song Making Plans for Nigel.

See also 
 British Iron and Steel Research Association

References

Bibliography

Further reading
 , on nationalization 1945–50, pp 183–235
Dudley, G. F., and J. J. Richardson, eds. Politics and Steel in Britain, 1967–1988: The Life and Times of the British Steel Corporation (1990)
Rhodes, Martin; Wright, Vincent. "The European Steel Unions and the Steel Crisis, 1974–84: A Study in the Demise of Traditional Unionism," British Journal of Political Science, April 1988, Vol. 18 Issue 2, pp 171–195 in JSTOR
Scheuerman, William. The Steel Crisis: The Economics and Politics of a Declining Industry (1986)

External links 
British Steel Corporation, 1988 Competition Commission report
British Steel plc and C Walker & Sons (Holdings) Ltd, 1990 Competition Commission report

Catalogue of the BSC archives, held at the Modern Records Centre, University of Warwick
Catalogue of the BSC Department of Operational Research archives, held at the Modern Records Centre, University of Warwick

Steel companies of the United Kingdom
Defunct companies of the United Kingdom
Former nationalised industries of the United Kingdom
British companies established in 1967
Manufacturing companies established in 1967
Manufacturing companies disestablished in 1999
1967 establishments in England
1999 disestablishments in England
Companies formerly listed on the London Stock Exchange
British companies disestablished in 1999
Tata Steel Europe